Yvonne Chauffin (26 March 1905, Lille – 6 December 1995, Caudan) was a 20th-century French writer. A catholic, she wrote as a critic for Le Pèlerin. She received the Prix Breizh in 1970.

Work 
1952: Marqués sur l'épaule, Amiot Dumont
1952–1955: Les Rambourt, novel, La Table Ronde: I. Que votre volonté soit faite, 1952 ; II. Le combat de Jacob, 1953 ; III. La porte des Hébreux, 1954 ; IV. Le voyage de Tobie, 1955. (Grand prix catholique de littérature in 1956)
1958: La Brûlure, novel, Le livre contemporain
1960: La Marion du Faoüet, novel
1961: Saint-Jérôme, France Empire
1961: Risquer sa chance sur Dieu, essay, Éditions France-Empire
1961: Le Carrelage
1967: Le Séminariste
1970: La Cellule, novel, Plon, Prix Breizh 1970
1976: Les Amours difficiles, novel
1976: L'Église est liberté : le cardinal Koenig, essay
1976: Le Tribunal du merveilleux, (with )

Bibliography
 , .

Sources 

External links 
 Yvonne Chauffin racontée par ses petits-enfants on Ouest France (6 June 2016)
 Yvonne Chauffin on Babelio
 Yvonne Chauffin, grande femme littéraire on Le Télégramme (9 June 2016)

20th-century French non-fiction writers
French Roman Catholic writers
1905 births
1995 deaths
Writers from Lille
20th-century French women writers